Korppi is a Finnish-language surname. Notable people with the surname include:
Henrik Korpi, Swedish songwriter and record producer
Janne Korpi, Finnish snowboarder and harness racing driver
Kiira Korpi, Finnish figure skater
Norman Korpi,  American painter, fashion designer, filmmaker and reality television star
Pekka Korpi, Finnish harness racing trainer and driver
Rauno Korpi,  Finnish ice hockey coach
Sture Korpi, Swedish politician
Walter Korpi, Swedish sociologist

Finnish-language surnames